Toros (named after the mountain range in which the village has been founded) or Küçüksorgun, as it is popularly called, is a village in the Erdemli district of Mersin Province, Turkey. It is also connected to north (Ayrancı in Karaman Province) over the mountains by a stabilized road through 300-year-old cedar forests. The village is situated in the Taurus Mountains and is one of the highest locations of Mersin Province. In summers it is used as a summer resort so-called yayla. The settled (winter) population of Toros was 162  as of 2012.

Around Toros, there are ruins dating back to the Roman and Byzantine eras and tombstones from the Ottoman era. The main economic activities of the village are vegetable agriculture and beekeeping. The main crops are tomato, cucumber, beans and cabbage.

References

Villages in Erdemli District
Yaylas in Turkey